Greece was the host country for the 2004 Summer Olympics in Athens, from 13 to 29 August 2004. As the progenitor nation and in keeping with tradition, Greek athletes have competed at every Summer Olympics in the modern era, alongside Australia, Great Britain, and Switzerland. The Hellenic Olympic Committee sent a total of 426 athletes to the Games, 215 men and 211 women, and had achieved automatic qualification places in all sports, with the exception of men's and women's field hockey. It was also the nation's largest team ever in Summer Olympic history since the first modern Games were held in 1896.

Unlike most of the Olympic opening ceremonies, where the country enters first as a tribute to its history as the birthplace of the ancient Olympics and the host of the first modern Olympics in 1896, the country entered the last in the opening ceremony as the host nation. However, the Greek flag-bearer entered first, honoring the traditional role of Greece in opening the Parade of Nations, and the whole Greek delegation entered at the end, the traditional place for the host nation.

Greece left the Summer Olympic Games with a total of sixteen medals (six gold, six silver, and four bronze), finishing within the top fifteen position in the overall medal rankings. At least a single medal was awarded to the Greek team in ten sports; five of them came from the track and field, including two prestigious golds. Greece also topped the medal tally in diving, gymnastics, judo, and sailing. Three Greek athletes added Olympic medals to their career hardware from the previous editions.

Among the nation's medalists were track hurdler Fani Halkia, race walker Athanasia Tsoumeleka, teenage judoka Ilias Iliadis, and diving duo Thomas Bimis and Nikolaos Siranidis, who won Greece's first ever Olympic gold medals in their respective disciplines. Emerging as one of the greatest Olympic weightlifters of all time with three Olympic titles, Pyrros Dimas ended his illustrious sporting career with a bronze medal effort in the men's light heavyweight category on his fourth and final Olympic appearance. Meanwhile, Nikolaos Kaklamanakis, who won the gold in Atlanta eight years earlier, and lit the Olympic flame at the conclusion of the opening ceremony, picked up his second medal with a silver in men's Mistral windsurfing.

Medalists

|  style="text-align:left; width:72%; vertical-align:top;"|

| style="text-align:left; width:23%; vertical-align:top;"|

Archery 

As the host nation, Greece automatically receives the full allocation of six individual places, alongside entry to both the men's and women's team events.

Men

Women

Athletics

In athletics, the Greek team did not receive any automatic places for representing the host nation, as they had done in other sports. Greek athletes have so far achieved qualifying standards in the following athletics events (up to a maximum of 3 athletes in each event at the 'A' Standard, and 1 at the 'B' Standard).

Men
Track & road events

Field events

Combined events – Decathlon

Women
Track & road events

Field events

Combined events – Heptathlon

Badminton 

As the host nation, the Greek team were entitled to enter only two badminton players regardless of how they fared in the qualifying stages.

Baseball

Roster
Manager: 27 – Jack Rhodes.

Coaches: 1 – Mike Riskas, 14 – Ioannis Kazanas, 42 – Scott Demtral

Round robin

Basketball

Men's tournament

Roster

Group play

Quarterfinals

Classification match (5th–6th place)

Women's tournament

Roster

Group play

Quarterfinals

7th Place Final

Boxing 

Greece was guaranteed five male boxers at the Games by virtue of being the host nation, but the special 'host' places for men's boxing therefore became void, as the Greeks claimed places through the World Championships and the AIBA European Qualification Tournament.

Canoeing

Slalom

Sprint

Qualification Legend: Q = Qualify to final; q = Qualify to semifinal

Cycling

Track
Sprint

Time trial

Keirin

Omnium

Mountain biking

Diving 

As the host nation, the Greeks were automatically entitled to places in all four synchronized diving events, but for individual events, they had to qualify through their own performances through the 2003 FINA World Championships in Barcelona, Spain, and through the 2004 FINA Diving World Cup series.

Men

Women

Equestrian

Greece automatically received a team and the maximum number of individual competitors in show jumping, and at least a single spot each in dressage and eventing.

Dressage

Eventing

Show jumping

Fencing

As the host nation, Greece received ten quota places which can be allocated to any of the fencing events. Additional places can be won in specific disciplines in a series of qualification events.

Men

Women

Football

Men's tournament

Roster

Group play

Women's tournament

Roster

Group play

Gymnastics

Artistic
Men

Women

Rhythmic

Trampoline

Handball

Men's tournament

Roster

Group play

Quarterfinal

5th-8th Place Semifinal

Fifth Place Final

Women's tournament

Roster

Group play

9th-10th Place Final

Judo

Greek judoka receive one place in each of the 14 categories by virtue of hosting the Olympic tournament – the maximum allocation possible.

Men

Women

Modern pentathlon

As the host nation, Greece received one automatic qualification place per gender through the European and UIPM World Championships.

Rowing

Greece received only two boats in both men's and women's lightweight double sculls at the 2003 World Rowing Championships.

Men

Women

Qualification Legend: FA=Final A (medal); FB=Final B (non-medal); FC=Final C (non-medal); FD=Final D (non-medal); FE=Final E (non-medal); FF=Final F (non-medal); SA/B=Semifinals A/B; SC/D=Semifinals C/D; SE/F=Semifinals E/F; R=Repechage

Sailing

As the host nation, Greece received automatic qualification places in each boat class.

Men

Women

Open

M = Medal race; OCS = On course side of the starting line; DSQ = Disqualified; DNF = Did not finish; DNS= Did not start; RDG = Redress given

Shooting

As the host nation, Greece was awarded a minimum of eleven quota places in ten different events.

Men

Women

Softball

Team Roster

Preliminary Round

Swimming

Greek swimmers earned qualifying standards in the following events (up to a maximum of 2 swimmers in each event at the A-standard time, and 1 at the B-standard time):

Men

Women

Synchronized swimming 

As the host nation, Greece had a squad of 9 synchronised swimmers taking part in both the duet and team events.

Table tennis

Greece fielded a four-strong table tennis team at the 2004 Olympic Games after being granted permission to use host nation qualification places.

Taekwondo

Greece had not taken any formal part in qualification tournaments in taekwondo, as the Greeks already had four guaranteed places at their disposal, two for men, two for women.

Tennis

As the host nation, Greece nominated two male and two female tennis players to compete in the tournament through their world rankings.

Triathlon

Greece offered a single guaranteed place in the men's triathlon.

Volleyball

As the host nation, Greece gained automatic entry for men's and women's teams in both indoor and beach volleyball.

Beach

Indoor

Men's tournament

Roster

Group play

Quarterfinal

Women's tournament

Roster

Group play

Water polo

Men's tournament

Roster

Group play

Semifinal

Bronze Medal Final

Women's tournament

Roster

Group play

Quarterfinal

Semifinal

Gold Medal Final

 Won Silver Medal

Weightlifting 

As the host nation, Greek weightlifters had already received six men's quota places and four women's places for the Olympics.

Men

* Leonidas Sabanis originally claimed the bronze medal, but was disqualified after being tested positive for excess testosterone.

Women

Wrestling

Men's freestyle

Men's Greco-Roman

Women's freestyle

See also
 Greece at the 2004 Summer Paralympics
 Greece at the 2005 Mediterranean Games

References

External links
Official Report of the XXVIII Olympiad
Hellenic Olympic Committee 

Nations at the 2004 Summer Olympics
2004
Summer Olympics